Bryan Constant (born 27 March 1994) is a French professional footballer who plays for Schiltigheim as a forward.

Career
Constant made his Ligue 1 debut with OGC Nice in the opening game of the 2013–14 season on 10 August 2013 against Olympique Lyon coming on after 70 minutes for Jérémy Pied.

He is the younger brother of fellow footballer Kévin Constant.

References

1994 births
Living people
Sportspeople from Fréjus
Association football forwards
French sportspeople of Guinean descent
French footballers
OGC Nice players
ÉFC Fréjus Saint-Raphaël players
CS Sedan Ardennes players
SC Schiltigheim players
Championnat National players
Championnat National 2 players
Championnat National 3 players
France youth international footballers
Footballers from Provence-Alpes-Côte d'Azur
Black French sportspeople